The Imperial Diet was the deliberative body of the Holy Roman Empire. It was not a legislative body in the contemporary sense; its members envisioned it more like a central forum where it was more important to negotiate than to decide.

Its members were the Imperial Estates, divided into three colleges. The diet as a permanent, regularized institution evolved from the Hoftage (court assemblies) of the Middle Ages. From 1663 until the end of the empire in 1806, it was in permanent session at Regensburg.

All Imperial Estates enjoyed immediacy and, therefore, they had no authority above them besides the Holy Roman Emperor himself. While all the estates were entitled to a seat and vote, only the higher temporal and spiritual princes of the College of Princes enjoyed an individual vote (Virilstimme), while lesser estates such as imperial counts and imperial abbots, were merely entitled to a collective vote (Kuriatstimme) within their particular bench (Curia), as did the free imperial cities belonging to the College of Towns.

The right to vote rested essentially on a territorial entitlement, with the result that when a given prince acquired new territories through inheritance or otherwise, he also acquired their voting rights in the diet. In general, members did not attend the permanent diet at Regensburg, but sent representatives instead. The late imperial diet was in effect a permanent meeting of ambassadors between the estates.

History 
The precise role and function of the Imperial Diet changed over the centuries, as did the Empire itself, in that the estates and separate territories gained more and more control of their own affairs at the expense of imperial power. Initially, there was neither a fixed time nor location for the Diet. It started as a convention of the dukes of the old Germanic tribes that formed the Frankish kingdom when important decisions had to be made, and was probably based on the old Germanic law whereby each leader relied on the support of his leading men. 

For example, already under Emperor Charlemagne during the Saxon Wars, the Diet, according to the Royal Frankish Annals, met at Paderborn in 777 and officially determined laws concerning the subdued Saxons and other tribes. In 803, the Frankish emperor issued the final version of the Lex Saxonum.

At the Diet of 919 in Fritzlar the dukes elected the first King of the Germans, who was a Saxon, Henry the Fowler, thus overcoming the longstanding rivalry between Franks and Saxons and laying the foundation for the German realm. After the conquest of Italy, the 1158 Diet of Roncaglia finalized four laws that would significantly alter the (never formally written) constitution of the Empire, marking the beginning of the steady decline of the central power in favour of the local dukes. The Golden Bull of 1356 cemented the concept of "territorial rule" (Landesherrschaft), the largely independent rule of the dukes over their respective territories, and also limited the number of electors to seven. The Pope, contrary to modern myth, was never involved in the electoral process but only in the process of ratification and coronation of whomever the Prince-Electors chose.

Until the late 15th century the Diet was not actually formalized as an institution. Instead, the dukes and other princes would irregularly convene at the court of the Emperor. These assemblies were usually referred to as Hoftage (from German Hof "court"). Only beginning in 1489 was the Diet called the Reichstag, and it was formally divided into several collegia ("colleges"). 

Initially, the two colleges were that of the prince-electors and that of the other dukes and princes. Later, the imperial cities, that is, cities that had Imperial immediacy and were oligarchic republics independent of a local ruler that were subject only to the Emperor himself, managed to be accepted as a third party.

Several attempts to reform the Empire and end its slow disintegration, notably starting with the Diet of 1495, did not have much effect. In contrast, this process was only hastened with the Peace of Westphalia of 1648, which formally bound the Emperor to accept all decisions made by the Diet, in effect depriving him of his few remaining powers. From then to its end in 1806, the Empire was not much more than a collection of largely independent states.

Probably the most famous Diets were those held in Worms in 1495, where the Imperial Reform was enacted, and 1521, where Martin Luther was banned (see Edict of Worms), the Diets of Speyer 1526 and 1529 (see Protestation at Speyer), and several in Nuremberg (Diet of Nuremberg). Only with the introduction of the Perpetual Diet of Regensburg in 1663 did the Diet permanently convene in a fixed location.

The Imperial Diet of Constance opened on 27 April 1507; it recognized the unity of the Holy Roman Empire and founded the Imperial Chamber, the empire’s supreme court.

Participants 
From 1489, the Diet comprised three colleges:

Electors 

The Electoral College (Kurfürstenrat), led by the Prince-Archbishop of Mainz in his capacity as Archchancellor of Germany. The seven Prince-electors were designated by the Golden Bull of 1356:
 three ecclesiastical Prince-Bishops,
 the Prince-Archbishop of Mainz as Archchancellor of Germany
 the Prince-Archbishop of Cologne as Archchancellor of Italy
 the Prince-Archbishop of Trier as Archchancellor of Burgundy
four secular Princes,
 the King of Bohemia as Archcupbearer
 the Elector of the Palatinate as Archsteward (Erztruchsess)
 the Elector of Saxony as Archmarshal
 the Margrave of Brandenburg as Archchamberlain

The number increased to eight, when in 1623 the Duke of Bavaria took over the electoral dignity of the Count Palatine, who himself received a separate vote in the electoral college according to the 1648 Peace of Westphalia (Causa Palatina), including the high office of an Archtreasurer. In 1692 the Elector of Hanover (formally Brunswick-Lüneburg) became the ninth Prince-elector as Archbannerbearer during the Nine Years' War.

In the War of the Bavarian Succession, the electoral dignities of the Palatinate and Bavaria were merged, approved by the 1779 Treaty of Teschen. The German Mediatisation of 1803 entailed the dissolution of the Cologne and Trier Prince-archbishoprics, the Prince-Archbishop of Mainz and German Archchancellor received—as compensation for his lost territory occupied by Revolutionary France—the newly established Principality of Regensburg. In turn, four secular princes were elevated to prince-electors:
 the Duke of Salzburg
 the Duke of Württemberg
 the Margrave of Baden
 the Landgrave of Hesse-Kassel
These changes however had little effect, as with the abdication of Francis II as Holy Roman Emperor the Empire was dissolved only three years later.

Princes 
The college of Imperial Princes (Reichsfürstenrat or Fürstenbank) incorporated the Imperial Counts as well as immediate lords, Prince-Bishops and Imperial abbots. Strong in members, though often discordant, the second college tried to preserve its interests against the dominance of the Prince-electors.

The House of Princes was again subdivided into an ecclesiastical and a secular bench. Remarkably, the ecclesiastical bench was headed by the—secular—Archduke of Austria and the Burgundian duke of the Habsburg Netherlands (held by Habsburg Spain from 1556). As the Austrian House of Habsburg had failed to assume the leadership of the secular bench, they received the guidance over the ecclesiastical princes instead. The first ecclesiastical prince was the Archbishop of Salzburg as Primas Germaniae; the Prince-Archbishop of Besançon, though officially a member until the 1678 Treaty of Nijmegen, did not attend the Diet's meetings.

The ecclesiastical bench also comprised the Grand Master and Deutschmeister of the Teutonic Knights, as well as the Grand Prior of the Monastic State of the Knights Hospitaller at Heitersheim. The Prince-Bishopric of Lübeck remained an ecclesiastical member even after it had turned Protestant, ruled by diocesan administrators from the House of Holstein-Gottorp from 1586. The Prince-Bishopric of Osnabrück, according to the 1648 Peace of Westphalia was under alternating rule of a Catholic bishop and a Lutheran bishop from the House of Hanover.

Each member of the Princes' College held either a single vote (Virilstimme) or a collective vote (Kuriatstimme). Due to the Princes, their single vote from 1582 strictly depended on their immediate fiefs; this principle led to an accumulation of votes, when one ruler held several territories in personal union. Counts and Lords only were entitled to collective votes, they therefore formed separate colleges like the Wetterau Association of Imperial Counts and mergers within the Swabian, the Franconian and the Lower Rhenish–Westphalian Circles. Likewise, on the ecclesiastical bench, the Imperial abbots joined a Swabian or Rhenish college.

In the German Mediatisation of 1803, numerous ecclesiastical territories were annexed by secular estates. A reform of the Princes' college was however not carried out until the Empire's dissolution in 1806.

Cities 
The college of Imperial Cities (Reichsstädtekollegium) evolved from 1489 onwards, it contributed greatly to the development of the Imperial Diets as a political institution. Nevertheless, the collective vote of the cities initially was of inferior importance until a 1582 Recess of the Augsburg Diet. The college was led by the city council of the actual venue; with the implementation of the Perpetual Diet in 1663, the chair passed to Regensburg.

The Imperial cities also divided into a Swabian and Rhenish bench. The Swabian cities were led by Nuremberg, Augsburg and Regensburg, the Rhenish cities by Cologne, Aachen and Frankfurt.

For a complete list of members of the Imperial Diet from 1792, near the end of the Empire, see List of Reichstag participants (1792).

Religious bodies 

After the Peace of Westphalia, religious matters could no longer be decided by a majority vote of the colleges. Instead, the Reichstag would separate into Catholic and Protestant bodies, which would discuss the matter separately and then negotiate an agreement with each other, a procedure called the itio in partes.  The Catholic body, or corpus catholicorum, was headed by the Archbishop-Elector of Mainz.

The Protestant body, or corpus evangelicorum, was headed by the Elector of Saxony.  At meetings of the Protestant body, Saxony would introduce each topic of discussion, after which Brandenburg-Prussia and Hanover would speak, followed by the remaining states in order of size.  When all the states had spoken, Saxony would weigh the votes and announce a consensus.

Frederick Augustus II, Elector of Saxony converted to Catholicism in 1697 in order to become King of Poland, but the Electorate itself remained officially Protestant and retained the directorship of the Protestant body.  When the Elector's son also converted to Catholicism, Prussia and Hanover attempted to take over the directorship in 1717–1720, but without success.  The Electors of Saxony would head the Protestant body until the end of the Holy Roman Empire.

Collection of records 
After the formation of the new German Empire in 1871, the Historical Commission of the Bavarian Academy of Sciences started to collect imperial records (Reichsakten) and imperial diet records (Reichstagsakten). In 1893 the commission published the first volume. At present the years 1524–1527 and years up to 1544 are being collected and researched. A volume dealing with the 1532 Diet of Regensburg, including the peace negotiations with the Protestants in Schweinfurt and Nuremberg, by Rosemarie Aulinger of Vienna was published in 1992.

Locations of Imperial Diets

See also 
Imperial Diet (disambiguation)

References

Bibliography 
 Peter Claus Hartmann: Das Heilige Römische Reich deutscher Nation in der Neuzeit 1486–1806. Stuttgart 2005, .
 Axel Gotthard: Das Alte Reich 1495–1806. Darmstadt 2003, 
 Edgar Liebmann: Reichstag. In: Friedrich Jaeger (Hrsg.): Enzyklopädie der Neuzeit, Bd. 10: Physiologie-Religiöses Epos. Stuttgart 2009, str. 948–953, 
 Barbara Stollberg-Rilinger: Des Kaisers alte Kleider. Verfassungsgeschichte und Symbolsprache des Alten Reiches. München 2008, 
 Helmut Neuhaus: Das Reich in der frühen Neuzeit (Enzyklopädie Deutscher Geschichte, Band 42). München 2003, .
 Heinz Angermeier: Das alte Reich in der deutschen Geschichte. Studien über Kontinuitäten und Zäsuren. München 1998,

External links 

Historical legislatures